Gust L. Stemmler (December 10, 1899 – November 1986) is a former Democratic member of the Pennsylvania House of Representatives.
 He served as a representative from 1963 to 1972.

References

Democratic Party members of the Pennsylvania House of Representatives
1899 births
1986 deaths
20th-century American politicians